James Scribner may refer to:

 James K. Scribner (1828–1910), member of the Wisconsin State Assembly
 James M. Scribner (1920–1941), United States Navy sailor